The name Amelia has been used for one tropical cyclone in the North Atlantic Ocean and two tropical cyclones to the north of Australia.

Atlantic Ocean:
 Tropical Storm Amelia (1978), a weak tropical storm that made landfall in Texas; severe flooding killed 33 people and caused $20 million (1978 USD) in damage

Australian region:
 Cyclone Amelia (1975), formed in the Arafura Sea and made landfall in the Northern Territory
 Cyclone Amelia (1981), formed in the Gulf of Carpentaria and passed over the northernmost part of the Northern Territory before dissipating in the Timor Sea

Atlantic hurricane set index articles
Australian region cyclone set index articles